= Kola'a, Honiara =

Kola'a
- Ward
- Interactive map of Kola'a
- Coordinates: 9°25′55″S 159°57′20″E
- Country: Solomon Islands
- Island: Guadalcanal
- Time zone: UTC+11 (UTC)

Kola'a is a suburb of Honiara, Solomon Islands.
